Scardino is a surname. Notable people with the surname include:

 Don Scardino (born 1948), American television director and producer
 Hal Scardino (born 1982), American actor
 Marjorie Scardino (born 1947), American-born British business executive
 Peter T. Scardino (born 1945), American cancer surgeon

Italian-language surnames